Samvel K. Shoukourian (born August 18, 1950, in Yerevan) is an Armenian Computer scientist and engineer. Doctor of Science in Physics and Mathematics (1990), Professor (1993), academician of National Academy of Sciences of Armenia (1996),

Biography
Samvel K. Shoukourian was born in Yerevan in the family of doctor, RA Honored Scientist Kim Shoukourian. In 1972 he graduated from Yerevan Polytechnic Institute. In 1972-1993 he worked at the Yerevan Computer Research and Development Institute, meanwhile, since 1977, at Yerevan State University. 1993-2007 he was the  Head of the Chair of Algorithmic Languages, since 2007 - Head of the Department of Information Systems and Information Systems of the Information Technologies Research and Education Center. He has been Chief Scientific Advisor and Development Director in different international companies. Since 2000, he is directing the Department of Embedded Test and Repair at Virage Logic Corporation (USA) and since 2010, the same department at Synopsys, Inc (USA).

The main topics of his current research interests include testing of electronic devices and systems, formal models of distributed systems, information technologies and architectures for multimedia virtual environments.

Awards 
 Acknowledgment of Prime Minister of Armenia, 2009
 Silver Medal of the Exhibition of National Economic Achievement of the USSR, 1986
 RA state award, 2013

References

External links
Samvel K. Shoukourian, Yerevan State University , Yerevan · IT Educational and Research Center

1950 births
Living people
Engineers from Yerevan
Armenian male writers